NGC 4527 is a spiral galaxy in the constellation Virgo. It is a member of the M61 Group of galaxies, which is a member of the Virgo II Groups, a series of galaxies and galaxy clusters strung out from the southern edge of the Virgo Supercluster.

Characteristics 
NGC 4527 is an intermediate spiral galaxy similar to the Andromeda Galaxy and is located at a distance not well determined, but usually is considered to be an outlying member of the Virgo Cluster of galaxies, being placed within the subcluster known as S Cloud.

Unlike the Andromeda Galaxy, NGC 4527 is also a starburst galaxy, with 2.5 billion solar masses of molecular hydrogen concentrated within its innermost regions. However said starburst is still weak and seems to be on its earliest phases.

References

External links 
 

Intermediate spiral galaxies
Virgo Cluster
4527
Virgo (constellation)
041789